"Hobo Humpin' Slobo Babe" is a 1993 song recorded by Swedish alternative rock band Whale, released as their debut single from their first album, We Care (1995). The song received critical acclaim and achieved success particularly in Europe, reaching the top 10 in both Denmark and Norway, and the top 20 in Belgium, the Netherlands, and the UK, where it peaked at number 15. In the US, the single became a radio hit, after being played incessantly as an import by KROQ Los Angeles. However, it only charted on the Billboard Alternative Songs chart, peaking at number 24. The accompanying music video, directed by Mark Pellington was played frequently on MTV and won an award at the first MTV Europe Music Award.

Critical reception
Larry Flick from Billboard wrote, "Enigmatic trio from Stockholm, Sweden, comes on like a frantic hybrid of Björk, the Beastie Boys, and Onyx on this concoction of wailing guitars, live hip-hop beats, male gang chants, and jiggly female warbling. A truly left-of-center, wildly contagious gem that demands instant attention from college and alternative formats. Once popsters take a moment to get used to it, they'll find it a more than worthy playlist addition." Troy J. Augusto from Cash Box commented, "After slaying the European press with its wildly eclectic Beastie Boys/Sugarcubes/Ministry bastard sound. Whale have set their sights on the U.S., where alternative and college radio has already become hip to the Swedish trio’s unique, spastic sound. Male hip-hop vocals and rhythms, the tortured-angel voice of Cia Berg and gads of noises, samples and chaos make for an unusual track worth at least one listen. Give this one a chance." James Masterton for Dotmusic described it as "frantic, and frankly bizarre". A reviewer from Gavin Report felt it "have a sound that's a bit like The Sugarcubes meet the Red Hot Chili Peppers—unusual female vocals, solid beats and heavy on the funk."

Ross Jones from The Guardian declared it as a "fantastic debut single", noting its "loud, heavily distorted guitars, synth-bass, and cooing girlie vocals". Another editor, Caroline Sullivan, felt the chorus "outdoes a footballers' stag party for oikishness". Pan-European magazine Music & Media commented, "Forget about Jaws and save the whale! An anarchic school of fish is swimming in an ocean of super heavy funk. Confidently in the middle is a weird hightone female singer with the impact of a spoilt brat." A reviewer from Music Week gave it five out of five, calling it a "quirky, sleezy debut" and "ace". Leo Finley from the magazine wrote that it "was about a woman who sleeps with tramps for a laugh. It was one of the best singles of the year, crossing the groove of Dee-lite with the power of the Beastie Boys at their best". James Hunter from Rolling Stone said, "That single, a roar of uprooted funk and hoarse cheerleading, had people all over the world wondering just who the hell Whale were – perhaps a band that sounded like it should have its own jersey? What they are is three Swedish kids who confuse the rah-rah boisterousness of European sports events with the sonic and sexual abandon of American rock & roll." David Sinclair from The Times commented, "An enigmatic slogan which quickly turns into a riotous yobs' chorus, "Hobo Humpin Slobo Babe" is a concentrated burst of meaningless frivolity swept along by a modish hip-hop beat and Berg's ludicrously echoed vocals." Sacha Jenkins from Vibe viewed it as "bright with obtuse lyrics, poppy symphonics, and a third-grade-ish shout-along chorus. Needless to say, "Hobo" and the trio soon crept into my subconscious's subconscious."

Music video
A music video was produced to promote the single, directed by American film director, writer, and producer Mark Pellington. Dave Sholin from the Gavin Report stated that "their video, like the song, is totally fresh". Leo Finley from British magazine Music Week commented, "They were the Swedish outfit with the shapely female lead singer baring her teeth braces to the world while the boys behind her showed off their Y-fronts." 
David Sinclair from The Times said, "Singer Cia Berg now boasts the most famous teeth-brace in pop since making the video for this arresting song." Sacha Jenkins from Vibe wrote, "I can remember a time, about a year ago, when my local request-a-video station was blazing–over and over again–with the mindlessly juvenily escapades of this naive looking, lusty, churning chanteuse, and these two dudes who jumped up and down around her like they were playing some frantic game of one-on-one, with the girl's head serving as rim and back-board." 

"Hobo Humpin' Slobo Babe" was played frequently on MTV and was also awarded the first MTV Europe Music Award for "Best Video" in 1994.

Track listing

 7" single, UK (1994)
"Hobo Humpin' Slobo Babe" — 4:00
"Lips" — 5:01

 CD single, Europe (1993)
"Hobo Humpin' Slobo Babe" — 3:59
"Lips" — 5:01
"Eye 842" — 4:25

 CD single, France & Benelux (1993)
"Hobo Humpin' Slobo Babe" — 4:00
"Lips" — 5:01

 CD single 1, UK (1995)
"Hobo Humpin' Slobo Babe" — 4:01
"You And Your Sister" — 5:18
"Singer Star" — 4:06

 CD single 2, UK (1995)
"Hobo Humpin' Slobo Babe" (Doggy Style by The Dust Brothers) — 4:37
"Hobo Humpin' Slobo Babe" (Sniffin' Plankton Mix by Monkey Mafia) — 6:46
"Hobo Humpin' Slobo Babe" (Skorpio Mix by Roni Size & DJ Die) — 5:11

Charts

Usage in media
The song appeared in an episode of the animated television series Beavis and Butt-Head in 1995.

The song was referenced in a Minecraft splash text, being removed in Minecraft version 19w12a.

References

 

1993 songs
1993 debut singles
Alternative rock songs
Warner Records singles
Music videos directed by Mark Pellington
Swedish rock songs